The following are the telephone codes in Eritrea.

Allocations in Eritrea

Mobile telephone services began in May 2001. However, no allocation data is available.

References

Eritrea
Telecommunications in Eritrea
Telephone numbers